Dentarene sarcina, common name the spiny wheel shell, is a species of sea snail, a marine gastropod mollusk in the family Liotiidae.

Description
The size of the shell varies between 8 mm and 13 mm.

Distribution
This marine species occurs in the Western Pacific and off the Philippines and Japan.

References

 Higo, S., Callomon, P. & Goto, Y. (1999). Catalogue and bibliography of the marine shell-bearing Mollusca of Japan. Osaka. : Elle Scientific Publications. 749 pp.

External links
 To World Register of Marine Species
 

sarcina
Gastropods described in 1929